The German national rugby sevens team competes in the top-level European sevens competition, the Sevens Grand Prix Series. In 2012, Germany finished eleventh out of twelve teams and avoided relegation. The team also unsuccessfully took part in the 2013 Rugby World Cup Sevens qualifying tournament in Moscow in July 2012.

In 2015 Germany qualified to the Final 2016 Olympic Qualification Tournament, where they failed to qualify for the 2016 Summer Olympics.

Germany won the 2019 Rugby Europe Sevens Grand Prix Series, an equivalent to European Championships in other team sports.

History

The team has taken part in the Hong Kong Sevens tournament in the past, its greatest success being a win in the Bowl final in 1990, beating Thailand 28–12. In the 1990s, the team, captained by Rainer Kumm, took part in a number of international tournaments including the Punta del Este Sevens in 1997, where they lost to Argentina in the plate final and the Paris Sevens in 1996, 1997 (when they defeated Romania in the bowl final) and 1998 (bowl finalists, losing to Japan in the final).

Kumm retired in 2000 to take up coaching and was replaced as captain by Mark Schulze, who led the team to the 2000 Sri Lanka Sevens, where they reached the cup semi-final, having won their pool and defeated Hong Kong in the quarter-final.

In 2000 the German Rugby Federation celebrated its centenary. Centenary celebrations included the hosting in 2000 the European leg of qualifying for the 2001 Rugby World Cup Sevens in Heidelberg, followed by a Centenary banquet in the Heidelberg Castle. In the tournament the German team thrashed Switzerland and Yugoslavia and lost 12–35 to Ireland, who had Gordon D'Arcy in their line-up.

In 2005 Germany hosted the 2005 World Games were Germany participated in the rugby sevens tournament. After losing all three games on the first day of the tournament, Germany went on to the Bowl semifinals were they lost 35–12 against France and 31–17 against Japan in the Seventh Place final.

After years of playing in the lower ranks of the Sevens Grand Prix, Germany started a continuous uprise which ultimately led to a second place in the 2018 Sevens Grand Prix behind Ireland and to winning the 2019 Sevens Grand Prix in front of France. Since 2016 they participated four times in the Hong Kong Sevens Qualifier where they reached the finals two times.

Tournament history

World Cup Sevens record

Summer Olympics record

World Rugby Sevens Series

World Rugby Sevens Challenger Series

World Games

Sevens Grand Prix Series

Honours

Sevens Grand Prix Series
 Winners: 2019
 Runner-up: 2018
 Third-place: 2002
 Fourth-place: 2003, 2016

Current squad 
Squad at 2020 World Rugby Sevens Challenger Series (men):
Fabian Heimpel (RG Heidelberg)
Tim Lichtenberg (RG Heidelberg)
Bastian Himmer (RG Heidelberg)
Carlos Soteras Merz (RG Heidelberg)
Tim Biniak (RG Heidelberg)
Sebastian Fromm (RG Heidelberg)
Manasah Sita (SC Neuenheim)
Leon Hees (RK Heusenstamm)
Zani Dembele (Castres Olympique)
Jacobus Otto (TSV Handschuhsheim)
Anjo Buckman (TSV Handschuhsheim)
Phil Szczesny (Hannover 78)
Jarrod Saul (Hannover 78)
Jonathon Dawe (Worthing Raiders RFC)

References

External links
 Deutscher Rugby-Verband – Official Site
 German Sevens team at totalrugby.de
 Hannover sevens website 

National rugby sevens teams
sevens